(born September 20, 1971) is a Japanese Greco-Roman wrestler.

Kado won the silver medal in the Men's 48 kg Greco-Roman wrestling at the 1995 World Wrestling Championships held in Prague. Next year he completed in the Men's 48 kg Greco-Roman wrestling at the 1996 Summer Olympics but finished in 7th place, losing to two-time European Champion Zafar Guliyev of Russia in Round One.

References

External links
 Hiroshi Kado profile at sports-reference.com

1971 births
Living people
Olympic wrestlers of Japan
Wrestlers at the 1996 Summer Olympics
Japanese male sport wrestlers
World Wrestling Championships medalists
20th-century Japanese people
21st-century Japanese people